Stephen Robinson (born 10 December 1974) is a former football player and coach who is manager of St Mirren. During his career he played for Tottenham Hotspur, Leyton Orient, AFC Bournemouth, Preston North End, Bristol City, Luton Town and Northern Ireland. Robinson has managed Oldham Athletic, Motherwell, Morecambe and St Mirren.

Early and personal life
Robinson was born in Lisburn, Northern Ireland. His son Harry is also a footballer.

On 28 February 2020, Robinson was acquitted at Edinburgh Sheriff Court of assaulting his partner Robyn Lauchlan on Waverley Bridge in Edinburgh on 13 December 2019. Lauchlan wrote several letters to the procurator fiscal asking for the charges to be dropped, stating "In no shape or form have I ever been a victim of domestic abuse. At no stage did Stephen push, shove or frighten me. He did not do the things he was accused of."

Club career
Robinson began his career with the Tottenham Hotspur youth system as a trainee, signing a professional contract in January 1994. He joined AFC Bournemouth due to the lack of first team opportunities at Tottenham. After a highly successful time at Bournemouth, Robinson joined Preston North End in 2000. After failing to force himself into Preston's starting XI, he joined Bristol City on loan until the end of the 2001–02 season.

After this he joined Luton Town for a fee of £50,000 in 2002. He was forced to play on the right-wing by then manager Joe Kinnear, despite his position being an attacking centre-midfielder in his Bournemouth days. New manager Mike Newell soon reverted Robinson to his favoured central-midfield role, and he was rewarded with a League One championship in 2005, and a tenth-place finish in the Championship in 2006. During the 2006–07 season, Robinson captained the side in Chris Coyne's absence and was handed a new two-year contract by Hatters boss Mike Newell. On 26 July 2008 Robinson agreed to a mutual termination of his contract at Luton.

International career
Robinson was capped internationally by Northern Ireland on seven occasions from 1997 to 2007. He also played for the under-16 (one cap), under-18 (two caps, one goal), under-21 (one cap) and B (four caps, one goal) teams.

Coaching career

Motherwell assistant
Robinson joined Motherwell in February 2015, to assist manager Ian Baraclough. He also assisted the Northern Ireland national team, working with Michael O'Neill, that qualified for UEFA Euro 2016. Robinson was previously manager of the under-age Northern Ireland squads, working for the Irish Football Association.

Oldham Athletic
Robinson was appointed manager of Oldham Athletic in July 2016. He was replaced as manager by John Sheridan on 12 January 2017.

Motherwell
Robinson returned to Motherwell in February 2017, this time to assist Mark McGhee as first team coach. Less than two weeks later, Robinson took over as interim manager following McGhee's departure from the club. He was subsequently appointed as manager on a permanent basis in March 2017. On 13 October 2017, Manager Robinson extended his contract with Motherwell until May 2020.

On 22 October 2017, Robinson guided Motherwell to the Scottish League Cup final after defeating Pedro Caixinha's Rangers 2–0 at Hampden. The game saw both managers sent to the stands for their behaviour on the touchline. They were defeated in the final 2–0 by Celtic. In April 2018, Motherwell won in the 2017–18 Scottish Cup semi-finals, overcoming Aberdeen 3–0, to set up another final with Celtic the following month; this was the first time the club had appeared in both domestic finals since the 1950–51 season.

On 27 September 2019, Robinson said clubs had a duty of care in relation to players' mental well-being if they were injured.

On 31 December 2020, Robinson resigned as Motherwell manager, after over three years in charge of the Lanarkshire side.

Morecambe
On 7 June 2021, Robinson was named as manager of newly promoted League One side Morecambe on a three-year deal.

St Mirren
Robinson returned to Scottish football in February 2022, becoming manager of St Mirren.

Career statistics

Club

International

Managerial record

Honours

As a player
AFC Bournemouth
 Football League Trophy runner-up: 1997–98

Luton Town
 League One: 2004–05

Individual
PFA Team of the Year: 1998–99 Second Division

As a manager
Motherwell
 Scottish Premiership Manager of the Month: February 2019

References

External links

1974 births
Living people
Sportspeople from Lisburn
Association footballers from Northern Ireland
Northern Ireland under-21 international footballers
Northern Ireland B international footballers
Northern Ireland international footballers
Association football midfielders
Tottenham Hotspur F.C. players
Leyton Orient F.C. players
AFC Bournemouth players
Preston North End F.C. players
Bristol City F.C. players
Luton Town F.C. players
Premier League players
English Football League players
Motherwell F.C. managers
Motherwell F.C. non-playing staff
Oldham Athletic A.F.C. managers
Morecambe F.C. managers
St Mirren F.C. managers
English Football League managers
Football managers from Northern Ireland
Scottish Professional Football League managers